The Lundberg Bakery (now known as the Old Bakery and Emporium) is a historic building in downtown Austin, Texas.  It is located at 1006 Congress Avenue, half a block south of the Texas State Capitol grounds. It was added to the National Register of Historic Places on December 17, 1969.

History
The building is constructed of limestone with a brick facade, and features a large cast-iron eagle at the peak of the gabled roof overlooking Congress Avenue. The building was completed for use as a bakery in 1876. The building served as a bakery until the death of its Swedish born owner, Charles Lundberg (1835-1895), who had settled into Austin during 1872. At the time the bakery first began operations, bread was not sold wrapped or packaged. People would wait in line with cloth lined baskets to place the bread in after buying it. Short story writer William Sydney Porter frequented the bakery as he passed it to and from work while employed at the General Land Office Building. .

The building was used as a bakery until 1936, and after that for a variety of purposes. The building changed hands frequently until being bought and refurbished by the Austin Heritage Society in 1962. It was threatened with demolition in 1970, when a new building was planned for the Texas Department of Transportation, but saved when excavations next door uncovered the foundations of the previous state capitol building (a temporary structure built in 1882). Following this discovery, the foundations were converted to a historical plaza, and the bakery was saved.
The Old Bakery was sold to the State of Texas which deeded the building and property to the City of Austin in 1980.

The Old Bakery and Emporium now houses the Lundberg-Maerki Historical Collection. The art gallery located on the third floor features a rotating schedule of exhibitions including artworks of local artists. The Old Bakery and Emporium operates as a consignment store spotlighting handcrafted gifts and fine art by local artisans with a visitor information center for tourist looking for fun attractions around Austin.

Gallery

References

External links

Old Bakery and Emporium - City of Austin
Old Bakery and Emporium - Conditions Assessment

Buildings and structures in Austin, Texas
National Register of Historic Places in Austin, Texas
Bakeries of the United States
Swedish-American culture in Texas
Art museums and galleries in Texas
Museums in Austin, Texas
Commercial buildings on the National Register of Historic Places in Texas
Recorded Texas Historic Landmarks
City of Austin Historic Landmarks